Ragnhild or Ragnhildr is a Nordic feminine given name, and may refer to:

People
Ragnhild (saint), Swedish saint
 Ragnhildr, mother of Harald I of Norway
 Ragnhildr in ríka, daughter of Eric of Jutland, wife to Harald Fairhair and mother of Eric Bloodaxe, e.g. in Heimskringla
 Ragnhildr, daughter of Erling Skialgson, brother-in-law to Óláfr Tryggvason
Ragnhild, daughter of Amlaíb mac Sitriuc of Dublin and mother of Gruffudd ap Cynan of Gwynedd
 Ragnhild (962-1002), under the Slavic name of Rogneda of Polotsk princess of Principality of Polotsk, princess consort of Rus'
Princess Ragnhild of Norway (1930–2012)
 Ragnhild Aamodt (born 1980), Norwegian handball player
 Ragnhild Aarflot Kalland (born 1960), Norwegian politician for the Centre Party
 Ragnhild Barland (1934–2015), Norwegian politician for the Labour Party
Ragnhild Eriksdotter (died 984), daughter of Eric Bloodaxe
Ragnhild Haga (born 1991), Norwegian cross-country skier
 Hildr Hrólfsdóttir (Ragnhildr Hrólfsdóttir), daughter of Hrólfr nefja and wife of Rognvald Eysteinsson
 Ragnhildur Steinunn Jónsdóttir (born 1981), Icelandic television personality
Ragnhild Michelsen (1911–2000), Norwegian actress
Ragnhild Mowinckel (born 1992), Norwegian alpine skier
 Ragnhild Sigurdsdotter, daughter of Sigurd Hart, identified as the mother of Harald I of Norway in the Ragnarssona þáttr

Other
Ragnhild, the daughter of archaeologist Sigurd Swenson in the film Gåten Ragnarok (2013)
, a number of ships with this name
Ragnhild Hansen, one of the children stolen by the witches in The Witches (novel)

See also
 Glavendrup stone, a runestone on the island of Funen in Denmark, created for one Ragnhild
 Tryggevælde Runestone, a runestone on which Ragnhildr is called sister of Ulf
 Uppland Runic Inscription 540, which mentions one Ragnhild

Norwegian feminine given names